Rishi Patialvi, 
(1917–1999), born Bam Dev Sharma, hailing from Hoshiarpur District (Punjab), was a popular Urdu poet belonging to Daagh Dehlvi’s lineage. He was a disciple of Naseem Noormahali who was a disciple of Labhu Ram Josh Malsiyani (1883-1976), a disciple of Mirza Khan Daagh Dehlvi. He died of a massive heart-attack on 26 December 1999 at Mumbai aged 82 years.
 
Five collections of his poems were published during the life-time of Rishi Patialvi, which are:-
1.Reg-e-Rawaan (1972) published by Biswin Sadi, New Delhi 184 pages
2.Phool Unki Mukaanon Ke (1978) published by Punjab Urdu Academy, Chandigarh 136 pages.
3.Roshni Kitni (1979) published by Rishi Publishing House, New Delhi 196 pages.
4.Chhir Gaii Jo Baat Unki (1980) –do- 152 pages
5.Shafaq Rang Aansoo (1981) published by Nao bahaar Saabir, Patiala 328 pages
His other works which are in Urdu prose include Riaz-e-Naseem (1978), Jaize (1966) and Partav-e-Jamhoor (1976).

References

Urdu-language poets from India
1917 births
1999 deaths
Hindu poets
20th-century Indian poets
Indian male poets
Poets from Punjab, India
People from Hoshiarpur district
20th-century Indian male writers
People from Patiala